On 14 March 2008, Abkhazia held local elections for the 1st convocations of its local assemblies in Sukhumi and all districts but Gali.

Background

On 11 December 1997, Parliament adopted the law on local bodies of self-government. President Ardzinba then issues a decree setting local elections for 14 March 1998. For the purpose of the elections, 148 precincts were created: 16 in the city of Sukhumi. 13 in the Sukhumi District, 33 in Ochamchira District, 29 in Gudauta District, 25 in Gagra District, 17 in Tquarchal District and 17 in Gulripshi District. The government stated that it was unable to hold elections in Gali District.

In April, after the elections, President Ardzinba appointed Heads of the District Administrations.

References

Sarke

1998
local